Gières is a commune in the Isère department in southeastern France. It is part of the Grenoble urban unit (agglomeration). The archaeologist Joseph Chamonard (1866–1936) died in Gières. Grenoble-Universités-Gières station has rail connections to Grenoble, Chambéry and Valence.

Population

Twin towns
Gières is twinned with:

  Vignate, Italy, since 1980
  Independencia, Peru, since 1989 
  Certeze, Romania, since 1990
  Bethlehem, Palestine, since 1996

See also
Communes of the Isère department

References

External links

Official site

Communes of Isère
Isère communes articles needing translation from French Wikipedia